The following lists events that happened during 1997 in Somalia.

Incumbents
 President: Ali Mahdi Muhammad (until 3 January), vacant thereafter

Events

November
 November 5 - The Red Cross aids the victims of the Somali flood.
 November 13 - The death toll of the Somali flood increases to 500.
 November 14 - Another 125 people are reported to have died during the Somali flood.
 November 17 - The death toll of the Somali flood reaches 2,000.
 November 23 - Food packets are dropped in southern Somalia for the flood victims.

December
 December 2 - The Somali flood report says that tens of thousands struggle to survive and people are hardly getting any help.
 December 3 - 1997 Somalia flood
 The floodwaters increase panic in Somalia as it threatens thousands of lives.
 The flood has been reported to have now affected over a million people.
 December 5 - United Nations helicopters arrive to aid Somalia during the flood.
 December 15 - The flood of Somalia eases as more people get emergency help.
 December 22 - After the floods, aid agencies in Somalia get concerned over the risk of cholera.
 December 25 - Hussein Mohamed Aidid and Former President Ali Mahdi Mohamed sign a power sharing pact to discuss forming Somalia's first central government for six years in the next two months.
 December 26 - Egyptian President Husni Mubarak told visiting Somali faction leaders that he will help rebuild Somalia.

References

 
1990s in Somalia
Years of the 20th century in Somalia
Somalia
Somalia